The Message at the Depth is the seventh solo studio album by Japanese hip hop producer DJ Krush. It was released in 2002. It peaked at number 23 on the Billboard Top Dance/Electronic Albums chart.

Critical reception

Tamara Palmer of XLR8R wrote: "With beats and melodies that outline the caliber of a classical composer, Krush rocks the international flavor that's he's honed on previous efforts with a true global hip-hop hybrid."

Track listing

Charts

References

External links
 

2002 albums
DJ Krush albums